The Jubilee Church, formally known as Chiesa di Dio Padre Misericordioso (Italian for "Church of God the Merciful Father"), is a Catholic church and community center in Tor Tre Teste in Rome. According to Richard Meier, its architect, it is "the crown jewel of the Vicariato di Roma's (Archdiocese of Rome) Millennium project" (p. 354). The Church serves eight thousand residents of the Tor Tre Teste area and was meant to socially "revive" Tor Tre Teste.

Meier was selected as the architect as winner of a competition that included famous architects such as Frank Gehry, Santiago Calatrava and Tadao Ando in 1996.

The site 
The Church's site is divided into four main parts: first, the precinct, including the church and community center; second, the northeast terrace; third, the northwest recreation court; fourth, the west parking area.

Design and construction 

Designed to look like a ship, the south side of the church features three large curved walls of pre-cast concrete. (The walls form segments of spheres.) Meier claims to have designed the church to minimize thermal peak loads inside. The large thermal mass of the concrete walls control internal heat gain; the result is less temperature variation, and supposedly more efficient use of energy. The walls are coated with a titanium dioxide-based cement (also known as Photocatalytic cement), to keep the appearance of the church white and free of plant-growth. Enrico Borgarello, the director of research and development for Italcementi, the company that designed the cement, claims that the cement destroys air pollution.

According to Borgarello:
"When the titanium dioxide absorbs ultraviolet light, it becomes powerfully reactive, breaking down pollutants that come in contact with the concrete. It is particularly good at attacking the noxious gases that come out of a cars  exhaust pipe."

Cardinal protectors
Crescenzio Sepe (cardinal-deacon 2001–2006; cardinal-priest pro hac vice 2006–present)

See also 
 Churches of Rome

References 

 Meier, R. & Frampton, K. & Rykwert, J. & Holl, S. (2004). Richard Meier Architect. New York: Rozzoli International Publications, Inc.

Further reading
 Ila Bêka & Louise Lemoine (2013) Xmas Meier, BêkaPartners, . Book and DVD (Trailer)

External links

 Official website
 Photos of exterior and interior of church

Dio Padre
21st-century Roman Catholic church buildings in Italy
Richard Meier buildings
Rome Q. XXIII Alessandrino
Roman Catholic churches completed in 2005